Pune Airport  is a customs airport serving the city of Pune, Maharashtra, India. The airport is a civil enclave operated by the Airports Authority of India at the western side of Lohegaon Air Force Station of the Indian Air Force. The airport serves both domestic and international flights. In financial year 2020, the airport handled over 8 million passengers. The airport is awarded as 'Best Airport by Hygiene Measures' in Asia-Pacific in 2020 by Airports Council International.

Overview
Pune Airport has a 2,540 m long runway oriented 10/28. A former secondary runway is now used as a taxiway by the IAF. A 2200m x 23m parallel taxiway was constructed by AAI to facilitate civil operation on the southern side of runway 10/28. The airfield is equipped with night landing facilities as well as navigational facilities like DVOR/DME and an NDB. As Pune's Air Traffic Control is operated by the IAF, there is often friction between the AAI and the IAF over flight schedules and night landings. There is currently a basic working relationship between the two parties; they have agreed to allow night landings of civilian flights for the time being, though this is not a long-term solution.

History
The airfield was established in 1939 as RAF Poona to provide air security to the city of Bombay (now Mumbai). The base was home to World War II squadrons of de Havilland Mosquito and Vickers Wellington bombers and Supermarine Spitfire fighter aircraft. In May 1947, the Royal Indian Air Force took charge of the airfield. The airport was declared as a customs airport in January 1997 for the export of specified goods. With effect from 12 December 2005, the airport was certified as a customs airport for the clearance of passengers and baggage. International flights to Dubai and Singapore commenced by Indian (Previously Indian Airlines) in 2005. These flights however were  not cancelled later. In 2004–05, the airport handled about 165 passengers a day or around 60,000 passengers. It increased to 250 passengers a day in 2005–06. There was a sharp rise in 2006–07 when the number reached 4,309 passengers a day (1,500,000 a year) and more than 2.8 million passengers a year in 2010– 2011 (about 8,000 passengers a day). The airport was ranked third best in the category of 5-15 million passengers by Airport Service Quality.

A  100 crore airport modernisation plan was launched in preparation for the Commonwealth Youth Games hosted by Pune. The terminal extensions have helped ease peak-time pressure of air passengers. Facilities developed on the air side include a new parallel taxi track and an apron expanded to accommodate eight Airbus A320 or Boeing 737 aircraft. Two aerobridges were also commissioned in 2011. New conveyor belts and passenger facilities including a modern spa were also commissioned.

The Airports Authority of India has invested  40 crore in 2018 for a brand new second terminal, which will be integrated into the existing one in order to ease air traffic. Construction began in late 2018 and is expected to be completed by July 2023.

All the offices of the AAI and the Central Industrial Security Force will move to the new administrative block, creating more space in the terminal building. The building will also house a VIP lounge with independent access to the airport terminal building. The airport power sub-station near the entrance gate will also be shifted to the new building this freeing up more space for developing passenger amenities.

An Instrument Landing System (ILS) has been proposed to ensure smooth takeoffs and landings even in deteriorated weather conditions.

Airlines and destinations

Statistics

Future

Cargo terminal
There is a proposal of creating an international cargo facility from this airport. This project will enable foreign cargo operators to operate in the airport. The airport was declared as customs airport on 17 January 1997, primarily for exporting perishable agricultural products. This project will also help to attract of foreign airlines to operate to the airport. The 600 sq.m. terminal will be located adjacent to the new adjacent second terminal.

Airport expansion

A second terminal is under construction on the eastern side of the current airport terminal. It will be twice the size of the current terminal. It will have 5 aerobridges and advanced technologies with duty-free shops and food courts. It was estimated to be completed by the end of 2020, but due to the ongoing COVID-19 pandemic, which caused lockdowns and curfews, it resulted in lack of labour and caused several delays in work. In September 2021, construction work resumed. As of November 2022, the new terminal is 75% completed, and is expected to be completed by May 2023.

Proposal for a new international airport

Due to the limited expansion options available, the airport will not be able to cope with the growing demand for air traffic into Pune. Hence, a greenfield airport for the Pune metropolitan region has been proposed. The Government of Maharashtra has entrusted the responsibility to Maharashtra Airport Development Company (MADC) for executing the Pune International Airport project. Probable sites for this project had earlier included areas around Talegaon Dabhade and Saswad near Pune. An area between Chakan and Rajgurunagar, around the villages of Chandus and Shiroli was under consideration.

However, due to land acquisition issues, a new site has been proposed. The greenfield airport will be located near the villages of Ambodi, Sonori, Kumbharvalan, Ekhatpur-Munjawadi, Khanwadi, Pargaon Memane, Rajewadi, Aamble, Tekwadi, Vanpuri, Udachiwadi, and Singapur near Saswad and Jejuri in Purandar taluka of Pune District in the Indian state of Maharashtra. The proposed airport in Purandar will be spread over 2,400 hectares. This airport will also boost trade from Pune and neighbouring districts as it will have its own dedicated cargo terminal. MADC requested proposals from consultants to conduct techno-economic feasibility studies, assist in obtaining the required statutory approvals and provide project management services.

In August 2020, deputy chief minister Ajit Pawar told the Pune district administration to check the feasibility of developing the new Pune International Airport at an alternative site proposed by Purandar MLA Sanjay Jagtap. The MLA had proposed land acquisition at Pandeshwar, Rise, and Pise villages, instead of the seven villages in Purandar taluka which have opposed land acquisition since the project was announced in October 2016. Total land acquisition cost is expected to be ₹ 4000 crore for the existing site. If the new site gets approved, land acquisition cost is likely to reduce.

Senior officials of the Maharashtra Airport Development Company Limited (MADC) have said that shifting the site of the Purandar Airport will lead to delay of more than two years in getting fresh approvals, and carrying out surveys of the new site.

Access
Pre-paid taxicab and auto rickshaw services to and from airport are available. Coach services to various key locations in Pune and private car rental services are also available. PMPML also operates airport shuttle to and fro from the city.

See also
 Airports in India
 List of busiest airports in India by passenger traffic

References

Citations

External links

 Pune Airport at Airports Authority of India
 

Airports in Pune district
Transport in Pune
Buildings and structures in Pune
Articles containing video clips
World War II sites in India
1939 establishments in India
1997 establishments in Maharashtra
Airports established in 1997
International airports in India
20th-century architecture in India